USNS Watkins (T-AKR-315) is one of Military Sealift Command's nineteen Large, Medium-Speed Roll-on/Roll-off Ships and is part of the 33 ships in the Prepositioning Program. She is a Watson-class vehicle cargo ship.

She was named for Master Sergeant Travis E. Watkins, a Medal of Honor recipient.

Laid down on 24 August 1999 and launched on 28 July 2000, Watkins was put into service in the Pacific Ocean on 2 March 2001.

According to The Guardian the human rights group Reprieve identified the Watkins and sixteen other USN vessels as having held "ghost prisoners" in clandestine extrajudicial detention.

References

External links

 Photo gallery at navsource.org

 

Watson-class vehicle cargo ships
Ships built in San Diego
2000 ships